Visage SDK (distributed as visage|SDK) is a multi-platform software development kit (SDK) created by Visage Technologies AB. Visage|SDK allows software programmers to build facial motion capture and eye tracking applications.

Technologies 

FaceTrack tracks 3D head poses, facial features, and eyes/gaze for multiple faces in a camera stream or from a video file. FaceTrack has configurable packages that include: facial tracking, face and facial landmarks/features detection, head tracking, and eye tracking.

FaceAnalysis includes machine learning algorithms to determine gender, emotions and age. FaceAnalysis is compatible with FaceTrack to find/track faces in images or video, and determine the gender, emotions and age for a specified face.

FaceRecognition is used to identify or verify a person from a digital image or a video source using a pre-stored facial data. visage|SDK's face recognition algorithms can measure similarities between people and recognize a person’s identity from a frontal facial image by comparing it to pre-stored faces.

History and application 

The development of visage|SDK began in 2002 when Visage Technologies AB was founded in Linköping, Sweden. The founders were among the contributors to the MPEG-4 Face and Body Animation International Standard.

Visage SDK is used in various application fields, such as game development, arts and entertainment, marketing and retail, marketing research, automotive industry, industrial safety, assistive technologies, health care, biometrics, audio processing and robotics. Recently, visage|SDK has been used to create solutions in virtual makeup and 3D face filtering.

Features 

 Tracks multiple faces and facial features in input video, images or in real time
 Returns 2D and 3D head pose, the coordinates of facial feature points (e.g. chin tip, nose tip, lip corners, mouth contour, chin pose, eyebrow contours), fitted 3D face model, and eye closure and eye rotation (gaze direction)
 Instant initialization: tracking begins immediately when a face is detected
 Can recover from loss of fidelity due to occlusions, rotation of the head, or other errors.
 Automatically detects separate people in front of the camera

See also 

 Biometrics
 Computer vision
 Emotion recognition
 Eye tracking
 Face detection
 Facial recognition system
 Marketing research
 Three-dimensional face recognition
 Motion capture

References

External links
 Visage Technologies Home Page

Commercial computer vision systems
Software development kits
Windows software
Linux software
MacOS programming tools
Programming tools for Windows
Android (operating system) development software
Computer vision software